
The following is a timeline of the history of the city of Reykjavík, Iceland.

Prior to 20th century 

 1750s –  textile workshops established.
 1752 –  (house) built.
 1771 – Prison begins operating.
 1785 – "Skálholt bishop's seat is moved to Reykjavik."
 1786
 Town charter granted by Danish government.
 Menntaskólinn í Reykjavík (school) active.
 1796 – Lutheran Reykjavík Cathedral built.
 1798 – Althingi (Icelandic assembly) relocated to Reykjavik from Þingvellir.
 1800
 6 June: Althingi abolished.
 11 July: "A new high court in Reykjavik takes over the responsibilities of Althingi."
 1801 – Lutheran Bishop of Iceland headquartered in Reykjavik.
 1816 – Icelandic Literary Society founded.
 1825 –  begins operating.
 1845 – Althingi active again.
 1846 – Latin School relocated to Reykjavik from Bessastaðir.
 1847 – Theological seminary established.
 1848 –  newspaper begins publication.
 1872 – Eymundsson bookshop in business.
 1874
 1000th anniversary of colonization.
 Thorvaldsen statue erected in Austurvöllur.
 1876 – Medical school opens.
 1879 –  founded.
 1881 – Alþingishúsið (parliament house) built.
 1882 –  in business.
 1886 – Landsbanki (bank) established.
 1890 – Population: 6,700 in town; 70,927 on island.
 1896 – Dagskrá daily newspaper begins publication.
 1897 – Reykjavík Theatre Company founded.
 1899 – Reykjavik Football Club formed.

20th century
 1903
 Office of Danish minister for Iceland relocated to Reykjavík from Copenhagen.
 Fríkirkjan í Reykjavík (church) built.
 1904 –  (bank) established.
 1907 – Reykjavik Athletic club formed.
 1908 – Women's suffrage takes effect in Reykjavik.
 1909 – National Library building opens.
 1911
 University of Iceland established.
  held.
 1912 – Route 41 (Iceland) (Keflavík–Reykjavik) constructed.
 1913 – Morgunblaðið daily newspaper begins publication.
 1914 – Eimskipafélag Íslands (steamship company) founded.
 1915
 January: Prohibition in Iceland begins.
 25 April: .
 1916
 Icelandic Federation of Labour headquartered in Reykjavik.
 Social Democratic Party (Iceland) founded in Reykjavik.
 1918 – January: Danish–Icelandic Act of Union signed in the Alþingishúsið.
 1919 – Population: 16,154.
 1925 – Reykjavík City Orchestra formed (approximate date).
 1927 –  (cinema) active.
 1929 – Landakotskirkja (church) built.
 1930
 Rikisutvarpid radio headquartered in Reykjavík.
 National Hospital opens.
 Reykjavík College of Music established.
  (labor dispute) occurs.
  in business.
 Population: 28,052.
 1932 – 9 November: Gúttóslagurinn (labor dispute) occurs.
 1940 – May: British occupation begins.
 1944
 Reykjavík becomes capital of Republic of Iceland.
  built.
 1946 – Civilian Reykjavík Airport in operation.
 1947 –  (cinema) built.
 1949 – March: 1949 anti-NATO riot in Iceland.
 1950
 Iceland Symphony Orchestra formed.
 Population: 55,980.
 1957 – Árbæjarsafn (history museum) founded.
 1961 –  (cinema) in business.
 1965
 Landsvirkjun (national power company) established.
 Laugardalshöll (arena) opens.
 1968 – Roman Catholic Diocese of Reykjavík established.
 1972 – World Chess Championship 1972 held in city.
 1974 – Population: 84,589.
 1975 – 24 October: Women's rights demonstration.
 1981 – House of commerce built.
 1986
 August: City bicentennial.
 October: USSR–USA summit held in city.
 Hallgrímskirkja (church) built.
 Sister city relationship established with Seattle, USA.
 1987 – Bíóborgin (cinema) active.
 1996 – Supreme Court of Iceland courthouse built.
 1998 – Population: 106,753.
 1999
 Reykjavik Power Authority (utility) formed.
 Iceland Airwaves music festival begins.
 2000 – Landspítali (hospital) established.

21st century
 2002 – Reykjavík Mosque opens.
 2005 – Population: 114,800 in city; 187,105 metro.
 2007
 18 April: 
 Dagur Bergþóruson Eggertsson becomes mayor.
 Grand Hótel Reykjavík tower built.
 2008
 October: Icelandic financial crisis protest begins.
 Hanna Birna Kristjánsdóttir becomes mayor.
 2009
 2009 Icelandic financial crisis protests.
 Höfðatorg Tower 1 built.
 2010
 29 May: Reykjavík City Council election, 2010 held.
 Jón Gnarr becomes mayor.
 Vatnsstígur 16-18 hi-rise built.
 2011 – Harpa (concert hall) opens.
 2012 – Population: 117,764 in city; 203,678 metro.
 2014 – Dagur Bergþóruson Eggertsson becomes mayor again.

See also
 Reykjavík history
 List of mayors of Reykjavík
 Other names of Reykjavík
 Timeline of Icelandic history

References

Bibliography

External links

 Europeana. Items related to Reykjavík, various dates
 Digital Public Library of America. Items related to Reykjavík, various dates.

Years in Iceland
 
Reykjavik
Iceland history-related lists
Reykjavik